Braulio E. Dujali (IPA: [bɾɐ'uʎɔ i du'hali]), officially the Municipality of Braulio E. Dujali, or simply referred to as Dujali, is a 4th class municipality in the province of Davao del Norte, Philippines. According to the 2020 census, it has a population of 35,729 people.

The municipality was established on January 30, 1998, by virtue of Republic Act No. 8473, carved from parts of Panabo and Carmen, and named after Braulio Española Dujali, leader of the first group of Karay-a settlers that came from South Cotabato (originally from Antique).

Geography
Braulio E. Dujali is located in Mindanao, and it is in the province's second political district. It is bounded in the north by the Municipality of Santo Tomas, Davao del Norte to the west, Carmen & Panabo City to the south and Tagum City to the east.

Climate

Barangays

Braulio E. Dujali is politically subdivided into 5 barangays:

 Tuganay Tikasan Gas Station
 Dujali
 Magupising
 New Casay
 Tanglaw

Cabay-angan is the second largest barangay, noted for its success in school sport competition. In Cabay-angan, Ayonayon, Valle and Diana are the most well known surnames in this place.

Magupising is the nearest barangay in Tagum City. Majority of the population are Muslims.

Tanglaw is the largest and the most populous barangay. It is noted for its park. The only barangay in the municipality that has a fully-roofed mini gym. Home of TNHS DBC, the most successful DBC in the municipality. It comprises 25% of the municipality's economy due to TADECO and other banana plantations that export products to other countries. The Davao Penal Colony (DAPECOL) is located here.

New Casay was named after Casay, a major barangay (sometimes mistaken as a municipality by visitors) in the municipality of Anini-y, in Antique Province. 
New Casay celebrates 2 fiestas yearly, every 15th day of August (Sr. San Roque) and every 21st day of December (Nstra. Sra. de Guía) a thanksgiving for an abundance harvests from rice crops and bananas with in the barangay as their primary source of income.
Most of the elders who ruled barangay New Casay really came from Casay and Anini-y, Antique which has been named after them. Obviously, they are also Antiqueños and speak Kinaray-a as their vernacular language.
The community was located in the center of the baranggay and often mistaken by visitors as a subdivision because of its proper housing arrangement. 
In 1960's, New Casay was then a forest area, it was a tough terrain to settle in but because of the people who are highly motivated to make it a good place to live, slowly they made constant changes.
One of those elders was Mr. Delfin Famarato.

Demographics

Economy

Significant to economic development of Braulio E. Dujali are TADECO company and local businessman engaged in banana based commercial production successfully operating in the municipality. Rice production also contributes to the economic development of the municipality.

Education
Braulio E. Dujali have several public and private schools.

Public elementary schools
 Balisong Elementary School
 Cabay-angan Elementary School
 DAPECOL Elementary School
 Dujali Central Elementary School
 East Cabay-angan Elementary School
 Magupising Elementary School
 New Casay Elementary School
 Sitio Bacali Elementary School
 Sitio Talisay Elementary School
 Tanglaw 3A Annex Elementary School
 Tanglaw Elementary School

Public high schools
 Antonio Fruto National High School
 Dujali National High School
 Tanglaw National High School

Private schools
 ABA Technical Institute (tertiary school)
 Zion Christian School of Tanglaw Inc. (kinder, elementary and high school)

References

External links
 Braulio E. Dujali Profile at the DTI Cities and Municipalities Competitive Index
 [ Philippine Standard Geographic Code]
Philippine Census Information
Local Governance Performance Management System

Municipalities of Davao del Norte